Coates may refer to:

Coates (surname)

Places

United Kingdom
Coates, Cambridgeshire

Coates, Gloucestershire
Coates, Lancashire

Coates, Nottinghamshire

Coates, West Sussex
Coates by Stow, in Lincolnshire
Coates Castle, a Grade II listed manor in West Sussex

United States
Coates, Minnesota

Other
 Coates graph, a kind of flow graph associated with the solution of a system of linear equations
 Coates Hire, an Australian equipment hire company
 Coates (supercomputer), a supercomputer at Purdue University
 Coates' disease, occasional spelling for Coats' disease, a rare human eye disorder

See also
 Coate (disambiguation)
 Cotes (disambiguation)
 Coats (disambiguation)
 Great Coates, a village and civil parish in North East Lincolnshire, England